Posthumus is a surname mostly stemming from the Dutch province of Friesland. Among variants are Posthuma and Postmus. The surname may have originated in the same way Romans called boys and girls born after the death of their father Postumus and Postuma, and the common Frisian name Postma sometimes is a derivative of such a name. Alternatively, the situation is reversed, with the surname Postma or Postema morphing to "Posthuma" and further to "Posthumus". People with this surname include:

Bryan Posthumus (born  1985), American politician
Chad Posthumus (born 1991), Canadian basketball player
Cyril Posthumus (1918–1992), British motoring journalist
Dick Posthumus (born 1950), American (Michigan) Republican politician
Hans Posthumus (1947–2016), Dutch football striker
 (c.1513–1599), Dutch painter and architect
Johannes Posthumus (1887–1978), Dutch gymnast
Kees Posthumus (1902–1972), Dutch chemist and university president
Lisa Posthumus Lyons (born 1980), American (Michigan) politician, daughter of Dick
Nicolaas Wilhelmus Posthumus (1880–1960), Dutch economic historian and political scientist, husband of Willemijn
 (1910–1987), Dutch Labour Party politician
Sieta Posthumus (born 1936), Dutch freestyle swimmer
Willemijn Posthumus-van der Goot (1897–1989), Dutch economist, feminist and radio broadcaster, wife of Nicolaas

See also
E.S. Posthumus, American music group composing electronic orchestral music, including "Posthumus Zone"
Posthumus Leonatus, a character in Shakespeare's play Cymbeline
Johannes Postmus (1877–1947), South African banker
 Posthumous
Postumus (disambiguation)
Johnny Posthumus, a character in Die Again, a mystery novel by Tess Gerritsen

References

Dutch-language surnames
Latin-language surnames
Surnames of Frisian origin